Ross Township is a township in Vermilion County, Illinois, USA.  As of the 2010 census, its population was 1,617 and it contained 704 housing units.

History
Ross Township was one of the eight townships created in 1851.

Geography

Cities and towns
 Rossville (south three-quarters)

Extinct towns
 Rossville Junction

Adjacent townships
 Grant Township (north)
 Jordan Township, Warren County, Indiana (east)
 South Ross Township (south)
 Butler Township (west)
 Middlefork Township (west)

Cemeteries
The township contains four cemeteries: Bethel, Mann's Chapel, Miller and Prairie Chapel.

Major highways
  Illinois State Route 1

Airports and landing strips
 James M. Adams Airport

Demographics

References
 U.S. Board on Geographic Names (GNIS)
 United States Census Bureau cartographic boundary files

External links
 US-Counties.com
 City-Data.com
 Illinois State Archives

Townships in Vermilion County, Illinois
Townships in Illinois